Nikolai Maim (26 February 1884 Tartu – 10 January 1976 Orangeburg, New York) was an Estonian politician. He was a member of Estonian Constituent Assembly. He was a member of the assembly since 25 July 1919. He replaced Karl Väli.

References

1884 births
1976 deaths
Members of the Estonian Constituent Assembly
Estonian emigrants to the United States